Jeong Chil-seong (정칠성, 丁七星; 1897–1958?), also known by her pen name Geumjuk (금죽, 錦竹/琴竹), was a Korean dancer, feminist, and independence activist.

Biography 
She was born in Daegu province, one of twenty three provinces of the Joseon kingdom. It was said that she came from a poor family. Her exact birth year is questioned often as others say she was born in 1902, 1905, and 1908, but others say that 1897 seems to be more appropriate. There are no details about her childhood or her family clan.

She was enrolled in Kisaeng school, also known as "Gyobang" when she was seven years old, even though the average age of entrants at that time was twelve or thirteen.

Jeong Chil-seong became an activist for the March 1st Movement, a public resistance against the Japanese occupation in 1919 .

She studied abroad in Japan in 1922 for a year when she was 15 years old to study English . Afterwards she came back to Daegu to establish the Joseon Women's Organization (조선여성동우회), a woman's rights group that was categorized as having socialism at its main influence with other notable Korean feminists such as Ju Se-juk (주세죽) and Heo Jong-suk .

References

1897 births
1958 deaths
South Korean writers
South Korean female dancers
Kisaeng
South Korean feminists
Feminist philosophers
South Korean politicians
South Korean scholars
Korean independence activists
Korean women philosophers
South Korean philosophers
Socialist feminists